Fritzia is a monotypic genus of South American jumping spiders containing the single species, Fritzia muelleri. It was first described by Octavius Pickard-Cambridge in 1879, and is only found in Argentina and Brazil.

References

Monotypic Salticidae genera
Salticidae
Spiders of Argentina
Spiders of Brazil
Taxa named by Octavius Pickard-Cambridge